A follis was a type of Roman and Byzantine coin.

Follis may also refer to:

 Follis (ball game), or balloon, a Roman ball game
 Follis (ball), a type of ball used in follis and other games
 Cycles Follis, a defunct French bicycle manufacturer

People
 Arianna Follis (born 1977), Italian cross country skier
 Charles Follis (1879–1910), first black American football player

See also
 Folli, a surname